Duke of Montellano is a hereditary title in the Peerage of Spain, accompanied by the dignity of Grandee and granted in 1705 by Philip V to José de Solís, Count of Montellano, Adelantado of Yucatán and descendant of Francisco de Montejo. It makes reference to the town of Montellano in Seville.

The present holder of the title is since 5 May 1979 Carla Falcó y Medina (b. 1957). She married Jaime Matossian y Osorio (b. 1955) in 1981, with whom she has two sons and two daughters, of whom the sons succeeded her in the following titles:
Don Felipe Matossian y Falcó, since 25 January 2011: 12th Marquess of Pons b. (1982)
Don Santiago Matessian y Falcó, since 14 March 2013: 5th Count of Santa Isabel, GE (b. 1984)

Dukes of Montellano (1705)

José de Solís y Valderrábano, 1st Duke of Montellano
Alfonso de Solís y Osorio, 2nd Duke of Montellano
José Ignacio de Solís y Gand-Vilain, 3rd Duke of Montellano
Alonso Vicente de Solís y Folch de Cardona, 4th Duke of Montellano
Álvaro de Solis y Wignacourt, 5th Duke of Montellano
María Vicenta de Solís y Lasso de la Vega, 6th Duchess of Montellano
María del Pilar Ossorio y Gutiérrez de los Ríos, 7th Duchess of Montellano
Felipe Falcó y Ossorio, 8th Duke of Montellano
Manuel Falcó y Escandón, 9th Duke of Montellano
Carla Pía Falcó y Medina, 10th Duchess of Montellano

See also
List of dukes in the peerage of Spain
List of current Grandees of Spain

References 

Dukedoms of Spain
Grandees of Spain
Lists of dukes
Lists of Spanish nobility